Shadows of a Great City is a 1913 British silent crime film directed by Frank Wilson and starring Alec Worcester, Chrissie White and Harry Royston. It is an adaptation of the 1884 play The Shadows of a Great City by Herbert Blaché and Aaron Hoffman. An American film adaptation was made two years later.

Cast
 Alec Worcester as Tom Cooper  
 Chrissie White as Nellie Standish  
 Harry Royston as Jim Malone  
 William Felton as Abe Nathan  
 Harry Gilbey as George Benton  
 John MacAndrews as Insp. Arkwright  
 Ruby Belasco as Biddy Malone

References

Bibliography
 Goble, Alan. The Complete Index to Literary Sources in Film. Walter de Gruyter, 1999.

External links

1913 films
1910s crime films
British crime films
British silent feature films
Films directed by Frank Wilson
British films based on plays
British black-and-white films
Hepworth Pictures films
1910s English-language films
1910s British films